Isagani Sybico Amatong (born October 19, 1940) is a Filipino politician from the province of Zamboanga del Norte. He last served as Congressman in the House of Representatives of the Philippines representing the 3rd legislative district of Zamboanga del Norte.

Early years
Isagani Sybico Amatong was born in Dipolog, Province of Zamboanga, on October 19, 1940, to Amando Borja Amatong and Felicidad Mabanag Sybico who were founders of Andres Bonifacio College. He graduated elementary from Miputak Elementary School, and finished her secondary education at Andres Bonifacio College as a valedictorian. He obtained his pre-medicine from University of the Philippines Manila in 1960; earned his Bachelor of Arts in Economics and Master of Business Administration from University of the Philippines Diliman in 1964 and 1970 respectively. In 1970, he earned his Bachelor of Laws degree from Andres Bonifacio College, and then became a full-fledged lawyer the same year. He also finished his Master of Laws in UP Diliman.

Career
Prior to his entry into politics, Amatong was a law associate. He also worked as a management consultant, a financial comptroller and trustee in Andres Bonifacio College, and founder-publisher for the Mindanao Observer.

In 1984, he was appointed as City Councilor of Dipolog after the death of his brother, Jacobo Amatong. He would then be appointed by former President Corazon Aquino to serve as Officer-in-Charge Governor of Zamboanga del Norte from 1986, until being elected as such in 1988 and 1992. After leaving the provincial capitol in 1995, he ran again for, won and served as Governor from 1998 to 2004. From there, he briefly retired from politics.

Amatong made his run for Governor in 2010 but was defeated. In 2013, he ran for Congressman of the 3rd District of Zamboanga del Norte and won. He would later on run for and win re-election bids in 2016 and 2019.

House of Representatives
In the 18th Congress, he is currently the minority leader of the House Committee on Accounts, and a member of the House Committees on Appropriations, Agriculture and Food, and Basic Education and Culture.

Notable works
In 2017, Amatong introduced House Bill No. 5040 in the House of Representatives seeking to carve out a new province from Zamboanga del Norte. The proposed Zamboanga Hermosa province was to consist of 12 municipalities and 2 legislative districts that make up the 3rd legislative district of Zamboanga del Norte: Baliguian, Godod, Gutalac, Kalawit, Labason, Leon B. Postigo, Liloy (its proposed capital), Salug, Sibuco, Siocon, Sirawai, and Tampilisan. However, the bill ultimately did not pass the 16th congress.

In 2020, House Bill No. 4226 which Congressman Amatong authored in 2019 was approved by the House Committee on Basic Education. HB No. 4226 seeks to convert Siocon National High School in the far-flung municipality of Siocon into Siocon Science High School. This measured would be passed in to law as Republic Act No. 11629, and was signed by President Rodrigo Duterte in December 2021.

Recognitions
In 2014, Amatong was one of the awardees of the UPAA Distinguished Awardees by the University of the Philippines Alumni Association for his role in Good Governance.

Electoral history

Personal life
Amatong is married to Anita Alto Amatong, and have three children together including Adrian Michael.

See also
 List of Philippine House committees
 Politics of the Philippines
 Congress of the Philippines
 Outline of the Philippines

References

External links
 Isagani Amatong, House of Representatives

|-

|-

|-

|-

Isagani
1940 births
Living people
Liberal Party (Philippines) politicians
People from Dipolog
University of the Philippines alumni
University of the Philippines Diliman alumni
Filipino city and municipal councilors
Governors of Zamboanga del Norte
Politicians from Zamboanga del Norte
Members of the House of Representatives of the Philippines from Zamboanga del Norte